Chahar Derakht (also Romanized as Chahār Derakht) is a village in Pain Rokh Rural District, Jolgeh Rokh District, Torbat-e Heydarieh County, Razavi Khorasan Province, Iran. At the 2006 census, its population was 34, in 8 families.

References 

Populated places in Torbat-e Heydarieh County